Kozarek Wielki is a settlement in the administrative district of Gmina Sorkwity, within Mrągowo County, Warmian-Masurian Voivodeship, in northern Poland.

The settlement has a population of 94.

References

Kozarek Wielki